Bishop's Stortford railway station is on the West Anglia Main Line serving the town of Bishop's Stortford in Hertfordshire, England. Its three-letter station code is BIS.

The station and all trains serving it are operated by Greater Anglia, including the half-hourly Stansted Express service.

History

The station was opened by the Northern and Eastern Railway as a temporary terminus on 16 May 1842, and became a through station on 30 July 1845 when the line was extended through to Norwich.

The station site included a large goods yard occupying the land now used for car parking as well as sidings running as far west as the riverside wharves of the Stort Navigation. To the east, a small turntable and engine sheds lay on land recently used as a garage and (as of 2012) earmarked for supermarket use. During the station's heyday, the station had two signal boxes, "South", located opposite the current building and behind platform 3, and "North", controlling access to the Bishop's Stortford–Braintree branch line.

For most of the station's life, four lines passed through it (as opposed to the current three lines); up and down main lines to the west of the now much extended island platform, and a branch line and passing loop (with access to turntable) to the east of the island platform, the northern end of which was located where the footbridge is today.

The line continued in use for freight trains and occasional excursions, closing in stages with the final section to Easton Lodge closing on 17 February 1972.

The station was the scene of a fatal crash on the last full day of the General Strike of 1926 when a southbound goods train manned by a volunteer crew crashed into the rear of an earlier train sitting in platform two. The platform canopy was demolished and a waiting passenger killed.

Services

The typical off-peak service is:
4 trains per hour (tph) to London Liverpool Street, of which:
2 call at Tottenham Hale 
1 calls at Harlow Town, Broxbourne, Cheshunt and Tottenham Hale
1 calls at Sawbridgeworth, Harlow Mill, Harlow Town, Roydon, Broxbourne, Cheshunt and Tottenham Hale
2 tph to Stratford, of which
1 calls at Sawbridgeworth, Harlow Mill, Harlow Town, Roydon, Broxbourne, Cheshunt, Enfield Lock, Northumberland Park, Tottenham Hale and Lea Bridge.
1 calls at Sawbridgeworth, Harlow Town, Broxbourne, Cheshunt, Waltham Cross, Tottenham Hale and Lea Bridge
2 tph to Stansted Airport, both running non-stop.
2 tph to Cambridge North of which:
1 calls at Audley End, Whittlesford Parkway and Cambridge
1 calls at Stansted Mountfitchet, Elsenham, Newport, Audley End, Great Chesterford, Whittlesford Parkway, Shelford and Cambridge.

On Sundays this is reduced to:
4 tph to London, of which:
2 call at Tottenham Hale only
1 call at Sawbridgeworth, Harlow Town, Broxbourne, Cheshunt and Tottenham Hale
1 call at Sawbridgeworth, Harlow Mill, Harlow Town, Roydon, Broxbourne, Cheshunt, Tottenham Hale and Hackney Downs
2 tph to Stansted Airport, both running non-stop
2 tph to Cambridge, of which:
1 calls at Audley End and Whittlesford Parkway
1 calls at Stansted Mountfitchet, Elsenham, Newport, Audley End, Great Chesterford, Whittlesford Parkway and Shelford

Other services
On Mondays to Fridays a small number of trains during the peak hours are extended beyond Cambridge to terminate at Ely and King's Lynn. At other times it is necessary to change at Cambridge for onward travel using services provided by CrossCountry, East Midlands Railway or Great Northern, Great Northern services also serve King's Lynn.

Current use
The station has three platforms. Platform 1 is for services towards Stansted Airport and Cambridge. Platform 2 is used for services to London Liverpool Street and Stratford. Platform 3 is used for some trains that terminate at Bishops Stortford. It is also used by a few services to/from Cambridge via Stansted Airport which only start/terminate here. In the days before 1985 when Bishop's Stortford was the northern limit of electrification it was used for slow trains to London Liverpool Street and to Cambridge; therefore platform 2 was used for fast trains (Stansted Express). 
The station has two entrances. One from Station Road where there is ticket hall, waiting room and real time information. The other entrance is for direct access to Platforms 2 and 3. Ticket barriers have been installed at the station to prevent fare evasion.
In 2014 the station underwent extensive modernization resulting in the construction of a new ticket office, barrier line, retail outlets and a new platform canopy.

References

Further reading

External links

 

Railway stations in Hertfordshire
DfT Category C2 stations
Former Great Eastern Railway stations
Railway stations in Great Britain opened in 1842
Greater Anglia franchise railway stations
1842 establishments in England
Bishop's Stortford